Emmanuel Dubourg  (born December 26, 1958) is a Canadian politician, chartered accountant and teacher from Quebec. He was the Member of National Assembly of Quebec for the riding of Viau from 2007 until 2013. On November 25, 2013 he was elected to the House of Commons of Canada in a by-election to become the Liberal Member of Parliament for the Montreal riding of Bourassa.

Early life and education
Born in Saint-Marc, Haiti, he emigrated to Canada in 1974.

Dubourg obtained a Master of Business Administration at Université du Québec à Montréal and has been a member of the Ordre des comptables agréés du Québec since 1987.

Career
Dubourg was a teacher at Université du Québec à Montréal, Université du Québec en Outaouais and CEGEP Montmorency. He has been honoured with several awards and citations for his work over the years, including the Governor General's Medal, the Innovation and Excellence prize from Revenue Canada in 1992 and the Black History Month Award in 2006 for his work in the black community.

Political career
Dubourg won his seat in the 2007 Quebec Provincial Election, succeeding former Liberal MNA William Cusano. After the election, was named the Parliamentary Secretary to the Minister of Employment and Social Solidarity, a portfolio held by Sam Hamad. He was re-elected in the 2008 and 2012 general elections.

He resigned on August 9, 2013 to run for the Liberal Party of Canada's nomination in a by-election for the riding of Bourassa, triggered by incumbent Denis Coderre resigning to make an ultimately successful bid for mayor of Montreal.  He was elected on November 25, 2013 with 47% of the votes. He served as the National Revenue Critic for the Liberals, but was not promoted to Cabinet when the Liberals won the 2015 election. He was, however, appointed as the Parliamentary Secretary to the Minister of National Revenue, serving from December 2015 to January 2017.

Electoral record

Federal results

Provincial results

* Result compared to Action démocratique

* Result compared to UFP

References

External links

 Biography of Emmanuel Dubourg
 

1958 births
Living people
Black Canadian politicians
Quebec Liberal Party MNAs
Université du Québec à Montréal alumni
Academic staff of the Université du Québec à Montréal
Haitian emigrants to Canada
People from Saint-Marc
Politicians from Montreal
Canadian accountants
Liberal Party of Canada MPs
Members of the House of Commons of Canada from Quebec
Haitian Quebecers
Canadian people of Haitian descent
21st-century Canadian politicians